Saliceto is a commune in the Castagnicca valley near the town of Corte in the Haute-Corse department of France on the island of Corsica.

The village is the birthplace of Antoine Christophe Saliceti. The village consists of about two dozen stonewall houses and a small Catholic church.

Population

International relations
Saliceto is twinned with Saliceto, Italy.

See also
Communes of the Haute-Corse department

References

Communes of Haute-Corse
Haute-Corse communes articles needing translation from French Wikipedia